The Frauen DFB-Pokal 1980–81 was the first season of the cup competition, Germany's second-most important title in women's football. In the final which was held in Stuttgart on 2 June 1981 SSG Bergisch Gladbach defeated TuS Wörrstadt 5–0. The 1980–81 cup was the only cup that was played with each match other than the final going over two legs.

Participants

First round

Quarter-finals

Semi-finals

Final

See also 

 1980–81 DFB-Pokal men's competition

References 

Fra
DFB-Pokal Frauen seasons